Gahan (and its variant Gahame) is a surname with several different origins. One origin of the surname is from a reduced form of McGahan, which is in turn an Anglicised form of the Irish language Mac Eacháin, meaning "son of Eachán". Another origin of the name, in Leinster, is from a reduced form of the Irish language Ó Gaoithin, meaning "descendant of Gaoithín". The personal name Gaoithín is a diminutive of gaoth, meaning "wise", or "wind". In Connacht, Ó Gaoithin is sometimes Anglicised as Wynne or Wyndham. Occasionally, the surname Gahan may be an Anglicised form of the Irish language Mac Gaoithín, meaning "son of Gaoithín", although the more common Anglicised form of this Gaelic name is McGeehan in Ulster.

People with this surname include:
Arthur Burton Gahan (1880–1960), American entomologist
Charles Joseph Gahan (1862–1939), Irish entomologist
Dave Gahan (born 1962) (not his birth name), British singer
George Thomas Gahan (1912–1980), Australian politician and boxer
Gordon Gahan (1945–1984), American photographer
Graeme Gahan (1942–2018), Australian rules footballer
John Harvey Gahan (1888–1958), Canadian violinist
Matthew Gahan (born 1975), Australian baseball player
Thomas Gahan (1847–1905), American politician
Tracy Gahan (born 1980), Australian basketball player
William Gahan (1732–1804), Irish priest
and at least one having it as a given name:
Gahan Wilson (1930–2019), American horror–fantasy cartoonist and illustrator

References

Anglicised Irish-language surnames